The Temptation of Saint Anthony is a single-panel painting by Hieronymus Bosch, executed c. 1500–1510. It is housed in the Nelson-Atkins Museum of Art in Kansas City.

There was a dispute as to whether this work was a Bosch autograph or a piece by the workshop until the Bosch Research and Conservation Project concluded it to be autograph based on evidence present in the underdrawing. It was exhibited in 2016 as part of the Jheronimus Bosch—Visions of Genius exhibition.

References

1500s paintings
Paintings by Hieronymus Bosch
Paintings of Anthony the Great
Fish in art